Darren Raekwon McIntosh-Buffonge (born 7 November 1998) is a professional footballer who plays as a central midfielder for Dutch Eerste Divisie club Telstar.

Club career

Manchester United
Buffonge started in the youth system of Arsenal, prior to making the move across his hometown to Fulham in 2010. After five years with Fulham, Buffonge was signed by Manchester United's academy on trial ahead of the 2015–16 campaign. After impressing, the central midfielder penned scholar terms on 13 November 2015; despite missing several months with a groin injury. He left United on 30 June 2019 having not featured at first-team level, though did train with the senior squad on occasions. In the months leading up to his departure, Buffonge had trials with EFL Championship duo Derby County and Bolton Wanderers.

Spezia
On 9 August 2019, Buffonge moved abroad to join Italian Serie B side Spezia; penning a one-year contract, with the option of a further year. He made his professional debut on 18 August in the Coppa Italia, replacing Delano Burgzorg after sixty-two minutes of a defeat to Sassuolo of Serie A. His first Serie B appearance arrived a week later against Cittadella.

Loan to Pergolettese
On 31 January 2020, he was loaned to Serie C club Pergolettese. He made one league appearance, against Lecco on 9 February, in six months there.

NAC Breda
On 14 August 2020, Buffonge joined Dutch Eerste Divisie side NAC Breda. His debut arrived on 29 August against Jong AZ, having replaced Moreno Rutten after eighty-five minutes of a 6–1 victory. He scored his first senior goal whilst with the club, netting in a 4–1 win away to MVV Maastricht on 6 November.

His contract was not extended after the 2021–22 season, making him a free agent.

In January 2023, Buffonge joined Eerste Divisie side Telstar.

International career
Buffonge is eligible for England and Antigua and Barbuda. In February 2017, Buffonge was selected by Antigua and Barbuda for the CONCACAF U-20 Championship in Costa Rica. However, Buffonge didn't appear at the tournament after being replaced by Ajani Thomas.

Personal life
Buffonge's brother, Dajour, is also a footballer who played internationally for Montserrat.

Career statistics
.

References

External links

1998 births
Living people
Footballers from Greater London
Black British sportspeople
English sportspeople of Antigua and Barbuda descent
English people of Montserratian descent
English footballers
Association football midfielders
English expatriate footballers
Expatriate footballers in Italy
Expatriate footballers in the Netherlands
English expatriate sportspeople in Italy
English expatriate sportspeople in the Netherlands
Serie B players
Serie C players
Eerste Divisie players
Spezia Calcio players
U.S. Pergolettese 1932 players
NAC Breda players
SC Telstar players